The Fairfield Stags women's basketball team is the basketball team that represents Fairfield University in Fairfield, Connecticut and competes in the Metro Atlantic Athletic Conference of NCAA Division I.

History
Fairfield began play in 1973, with the first varsity season being in 1974, and the first Division I season being in 1981. They have won the MAAC title in 1988, 1991, and 1998, with regular season titles in 1990, 1991

Roster

Postseason

NCAA Tournament appearances
The Stags have made the NCAA Division I women's basketball tournament five times. They have a record of 0–5.

WNIT appearances
The Stags have made the Women's National Invitation Tournament twice. They have a record of 0–2.

WBI appearances
The Stags have made four appearances in the Women's Basketball Invitational. They have a record of 4–4.

References

External links